Acie Boyd Earl (born June 23, 1970) is an American former professional basketball player, who appeared in four National Basketball Association (NBA) seasons, as a ,  center. He also played many seasons in Europe.

High school/college 
Born in Peoria, Illinois, Earl was a star basketball player from Moline High School playing varsity-level basketball for three seasons. He led the Maroons to a 23–4 record in 1988, along with future NFL All-Pro Brad Hopkins. Earl is currently the seventh leading all-time scorer in Moline basketball history.

Earl played college basketball at the University of Iowa, being a key recruit for Tom Davis' Hawkeyes. He appeared in 22 games in his first-year season, with an average of 6 points in 16 minutes, but still managed 50 blocked shots in limited playing time.

In his second season, Earl became a key force in the Big Ten Conference, averaging 16.3 points and 6.7 rebounds per game, with 106 total blocked shots. Iowa made it to the 1991 NCAA Tournament where they were defeated by eventual champions Duke Blue Devils in the second round.

In his junior year, Earl slightly improved his numbers (managing to block an average of four shots a game), while the college made it to the 1992 NCAA Tournament, only to lose, again in the second round and against Duke (also the eventual winners), 75–62, with Earl blocking 8 shot attempts, one shy of the all-time tournament record held by David Robinson.

With Earl still putting up strong numbers in 1992–93, Iowa again lost in the second round of the NCAA Tournament, now to Wake Forest.

Earl graduated as the 1992 Big Ten Defensive Player of the Year, and upon graduation held the Iowa career record with 358 blocked shots, and was second in total points scored with 1779 (after Roy Marble). He received his undergraduate degree in the fall of 1992 with a degree in Leisure studies.

Earl now lives near his alma mater in Iowa City Iowa.

Professional career 
Earl was selected in the first round of the 1993 NBA draft by the Boston Celtics with the 19th pick, in a year which included Chris Webber, Jamal Mashburn and Penny Hardaway. He played 74 games in his rookie season, averaging 5.5 points and 3.3 rebounds per game.

His statistics dropped in his second year, as he played in only 30 games, and was subsequently selected by the Toronto Raptors in the 1995 NBA expansion draft after the Celtics left him unprotected. With the Raptors, he posted his best statistical season, scoring 7.5 points per game, adding 3.1 rebounds. On April 12, 1996, against the team that drafted him—the Celtics—Earl posted a double-double, with 40 points and 12 rebounds in a 136–108 loss. Midway through 1996–97, he was traded to the Milwaukee Bucks, appearing in nine games in his final NBA season.

Subsequently, Earl took his game overseas, first appearing for Paris Basket Racing (France), also playing 21 games in Australia for the National Basketball League's Sydney Kings in 1998–99. In 1998, he also played with the Continental Basketball Association's La Crosse Bobcats.

He then represented Türk Telekom Ankara and Darussafaka Istanbul Spor Kulubu (Turkey), Unics Kazan and Saratov Autodor (Russia), Śląsk Wrocław (Poland), Traiskirchen Arkadia Lions (Austria) and KK Budućnost Podgorica (Montenegro), retiring in 2004. He also had a small stint for KB Peja, in Kosovo, helping the team become state champions.

Moving into coaching, Earl managed, during 2005, the Tijuana Dragons, an American Basketball Association (ABA) team based in Tijuana, Mexico.

NBA career statistics

Regular season 

|-
| align="left" | 1993–94
| align="left" | Boston
| 74 || 8 || 15.5 || .406 || .000 || .675 || 3.3 || 0.2 || 0.3 || 0.7 || 5.5
|-
| align="left" | 1994–95
| align="left" | Boston
| 30 || 3 || 6.9 || .382 || .000 || .483 || 1.5 || 0.1 || 0.2 || 0.3 || 2.2
|-
| align="left" | 1995–96
| align="left" | Toronto
| 42 || 7 || 15.6 || .424 || .000 || .719 || 3.1 || 0.6 || 0.4 || 0.9 || 7.5
|-
| align="left" | 1996–97
| align="left" | Toronto
| 38 || 0 || 12.0 || .376 || .000 || .629 || 2.2 || 0.5 || 0.3 || 0.7 || 4.3
|-
| align="left" | 1996–97
| align="left" | Milwaukee
| 9 || 0 || 4.8 || .348 || .000 || .714 || 1.2 || 0.2 || 0.3 || 0.1 || 2.9
|- class="sortbottom"
| style="text-align:center;" colspan="2"| Career
| 193 || 18 || 13.0 || .403 || .000 || .667 || 2.7 || 0.3 || 0.3 || 0.7 || 5.1
|}

Playoffs 

|-
| align="left" | 1994–95
| align="left" | Boston
| 1 || 0 || 10.0 || .333 || .000 || .000 || 2.0 || 0.0 || 0.0 || 1.0 || 2.0
|}

References

External links 
College & NBA stats @ basketball-reference.com
Basketpedya career data
Hawkeye Sports News – Where are they now? Acie Earl
TBLStat.net Profile

1970 births
Living people
African-American basketball coaches
African-American basketball players
American Basketball Association (2000–present) coaches
American expatriate basketball people in Australia
American expatriate basketball people in Austria
American expatriate basketball people in Canada
American expatriate basketball people in France
American expatriate basketball people in Kosovo
American expatriate basketball people in Montenegro
American expatriate basketball people in Poland
American expatriate basketball people in Russia
American expatriate basketball people in Turkey
American men's basketball players
Basketball coaches from Illinois
Basketball players from Illinois
BC Avtodor Saratov players
BC UNICS players
Boston Celtics draft picks
Boston Celtics players
Centers (basketball)
Darüşşafaka Basketbol players
Iowa Hawkeyes men's basketball players
KB Peja players
KK Budućnost players
La Crosse Bobcats players
Milwaukee Bucks players
Paris Racing Basket players
People from Moline, Illinois
Sportspeople from Peoria, Illinois
Sydney Kings players
Toronto Raptors expansion draft picks
Toronto Raptors players
Traiskirchen Lions players
Tuborg Pilsener basketball players
Türk Telekom B.K. players